Guriyat (also Romanized as Gūr’īyāt) is a village in Jahliyan Rural District, in the Central District of Konarak County, Sistan and Baluchestan Province, Iran. At the 2006 census, its population was 26, in 6 families.

References 

Populated places in Konarak County